Murphy Lakes are two lakes in King County, Washington, United States. Murphy Lakes lie at an elevation of 4741 feet (1445 m).

References

Lakes of Washington (state)
Lakes of King County, Washington